Richard Mähr is a Swiss curler. At the national level, he is a 1988 Swiss men's champion curler.

Teams

References

External links

Living people
Swiss male curlers
Swiss curling champions
Date of birth missing (living people)
Place of birth missing (living people)
Year of birth missing (living people)